Article comprises three sortable tables of major mountain peaks of Central America.  This article defines Central America as the seven nations of Belize, Costa Rica, El Salvador, Guatemala, Honduras, Nicaragua, and Panamá.

The summit of a mountain or hill may be measured in three principal ways:
The topographic elevation of a summit measures the height of the summit above a geodetic sea level.  The first table below ranks the 25 highest major summits of Central America by elevation.
The topographic prominence of a summit is a measure of how high the summit rises above its surroundings.  The second table below ranks the 25 most prominent summits of Central America.
The topographic isolation (or radius of dominance) of a summit measures how far the summit lies from its nearest point of equal elevation.  The third table below ranks the 25 most isolated major summits of Central America.



Highest major summits

Of the 25 highest major summits of Central America, Volcán Tajumulco and Volcán Tacaná exceed  elevation, 11 peaks exceed , and 24 peaks exceed  elevation.

Of these 25 peaks, nine are located in Honduras, eight in Guatemala, four in El Salvador, three in Costa Rica, two in Panama, and one in Nicaragua.  Volcán Tacaná lies on the Guatemala-Mexico border, Cerro El Pital lies on the El Salvador-Honduras border, and Pico Mogotón lies on the Nicaragua-Honduras border.

Most prominent summits

Of the 25 most prominent summits of Central America, Volcán Tajumulco and Chirripó Grande exceed  of topographic prominence, four peaks exceed , and 23 peaks are ultra-prominent summits with at least  of topographic prominence.

Of these 25 peaks, eight are located in Honduras, five in Guatemala, four in El Salvador, three in Costa Rica, three in Nicaragua, and two in Panamá.  Cerro El Pital lies on the El Salvador-Honduras border and Pico Mogotón lies on the Nicaragua-Honduras border.

Most isolated major summits

Of the 25 most isolated major summits of Central America, Chirripó Grande and Volcán Tajumulco exceed  of topographic isolation and 11 peaks exceed  of topographic isolation.

Of these 25 peaks, nine are located in Honduras, four in Guatemala, four in El Salvador, three in Panamá, three in Nicaragua, three in Costa Rica, and one in Belize.  Pico Mogotón lies on the Nicaragua-Honduras border and Cerro El Pital lies on the El Salvador-Honduras border.

Gallery

See also

List of mountain peaks of North America
List of mountain peaks of Greenland
List of mountain peaks of Canada
List of mountain peaks of the Rocky Mountains
List of mountain peaks of the United States
List of mountain peaks of México

List of the ultra-prominent summits of Central America
List of extreme summits of Central America
List of mountain peaks of the Caribbean
Central America
Geography of Central America
Geology of Central America
:Category:Mountains of Central America
commons:Category:Mountains of Central America
Physical geography
Topography
Topographic elevation
Topographic prominence
Topographic isolation

Notes

References

External links

Bivouac.com
Peakbagger.com
Peaklist.org
Peakware.com
Summitpost.org

Mountains of Central America
Geography of Central America

Central America-related lists
Central America, List Of Mountain Peaks Of
Central America, List Of Mountain Peaks Of
Central America, List Of Mountain Peaks Of
Central America